David Smallboy Korbah (born 4 March 1993) is a Ghanaian-born football defender and midfielder . He formerly played professionally for Zambian Premier League team Buildcon F.C. He has represented Ghana U20 in international youth squads.

Club career
Born in Aflao, Korbah started his youth football career with Black Panthers FC, a division two football team. He played also for the likes of Bayern Babies, Future Stars FC, Shooting Stars FC and Precious Academy.

Professional career
On 5 July 2011, Korbah signed his first professional contract by agreeing to a year contract with Premier League side Heart of Lions.
In late July 2012, Korbah joined Asante Kotoko. He represented the club in the Ghanaian Premier League and CAF Champions League competition.
In summer 2015 he signed a one-year deal with Ghana Premier League club Dreams F.C.

Buildcon F.C
On 22 February 2017  it was announced that Korbah had signed a two-year deal with Zambian Premier League club Buildcon F.C, completing his move from his former club Dreams F.C. and was given the jersey number fifteen.

International career
Korbah was a member of the 23 players selected by Ghana under-20's coach Maxwell Konadu during the 2013 African U-20 Championship qualification against Morocco U-20 for the 2013 African U-20 Championship.

References

External links

at WorldFootball                        
at ZeroZero
at Weltfussball

Living people
1993 births
Ghana international footballers
Ghanaian footballers
Ghanaian expatriate footballers
Asante Kotoko S.C. players
Association football central defenders
Association football midfielders
Buildcon F.C. players